Tömön-Suu is a village in the Moskva district of Chüy Region in Kyrgyzstan. It is located 18 km south of Belovodskoye, the administrative center of Moskva district, and was part of the former Karl Marks Kolkhoz.

Geography 
Tömön-Suu is located 18 km south of Belovodskoye, situated among the foothills of the Kyrgyz Ala-Too range.  The village is divided into 3 different regions: Artel in the north, Ukraine in the center, and Karl Marks in the south.

Tömön-Suu is the administrative center for the Ak-Suu village council, which also includes the villages of Ak-Bashat, Ak-Torpok, Bala-Ayylchy, Keper-Aryk, Murake and Chong-Aryk.

Demographics 
The population of Tömön-Suu was 2,568 in 2021. Tömön-Suu residents primarily earn their living from working the land and herding animals (especially cows).

Sights 
The village has a school, a hospital, a social hall ("club"), and a library.  There is also a cheese factory, now privately owned.  The village is also home to a memorial for fallen soldiers of World War II, as well as a statue of Karl Marx.

References 

Populated places in Chüy Region